The 1999 World Youth Championships in Athletics was the first edition of the IAAF World Youth Championships in Athletics. It was held in Bydgoszcz, Poland from July 16 to July 18, 1999.

Results

Boys

Girls

Medal table

External links
 Official results
Official site

1999
World Youth Championships in Athletics
Athletics
Sport in Bydgoszcz
International athletics competitions hosted by Poland
1999 in youth sport
History of Bydgoszcz